Hongō Junior and Senior High School (本郷学園 Hongō Gakuen) is a high school in Hongō, Tokyo, Japan. It was founded in 1923.

References

http://www.bloomberg.com/profiles/companies/7794776Z:JP-hongo-gakuen
http://www.insitejapan.com/index.php/japan-company/education/middle%20schools/hongo%20gakuen

External links
school website (in Japanese)

High schools in Tokyo
Educational institutions established in 1923
1923 establishments in Japan